30 Days is an upcoming South Korean romantic comedy film directed by Nam Dae-jung, starring Kang Ha-neul and Jung So-min. It revolves around a couple suffering from amnesia due to an unexpected accident, 30 days before the end of their marriage.

Cast 
 Kang Ha-neul as No Jeong-yeol, a lawyer
 Jung So-min as Hong Na-ra, a film producer
 Hwang Se-in as Hong Na-mi, the younger sister of Hong Na-ra

Production 
Principal photography began in November 2022 and ended in February 2023.

References

External links
 
 

Upcoming films
South Korean romantic comedy films
2020s Korean-language films